The Hulu Terengganu Hydroelectric Project is an underground hydroelectric power plant located the Terengganu, Malaysia. It was built from 2010 to 2015 by Tenaga Nasional Berhad, the largest electricity utility company in Malaysia.

Location
The project is located about 50 km West of Kuala Terengganu upstream of Tasik Kenyir reservoir involving dams on both the Terengganu and Tembat rivers.

Issues
World Wide Fund for Nature are questioning the need to clearfell an area three times larger than the size of the dam reservoir.

The International Union for Conservation of Nature has deemed 94 plant and animal species in the region threatened by extinction. Environmentalists are concerned that the project will kill endangered wildlife.

See also

List of power stations in Malaysia
Environmental concerns with electricity generation
Environmental issues in Malaysia

References

External links
WWF - Detailed Environmental Impact Assessment for Public Review

2015 establishments in Malaysia
Buildings and structures in Terengganu
Energy infrastructure completed in 2015
Hydroelectric power stations in Malaysia